Sergei Vladimirovich Borovsky (born 29 January 1956) is a football coach and former player.

Career
During his club career he played for FC Dinamo Minsk. He earned 21 caps for the USSR national football team, and participated in the 1982 FIFA World Cup. He won the Soviet Union premier league in 1982.

Managerial career
He managed the Belarus national football team from 1994 to 1996 and from 1999 to 2000. 

From 2016 till May 2017 he managed Dinamo Minsk.

Honours

As player
Dinamo Minsk
Soviet Top League champion: 1982

As coach
Metallurg Molodechno
Belarusian SSR League champion: 1991
Soviet Amateur Cup winner: 1991

Sheriff Tiraspol
Moldovan Cup winner: 1998–99

FBK Kaunas
A Lyga champion: 2003

Shakhtyor Soligorsk
Belarusian Cup winner: 2013–14

References

External links
Profile (in Russian)

1956 births
Living people
Footballers from Minsk
Soviet footballers
Belarusian footballers
Association football defenders
Soviet Union international footballers
1982 FIFA World Cup players
FC Dinamo Minsk players
Soviet Top League players
Soviet football managers
Belarusian football managers
Belarusian expatriate football managers
Expatriate football managers in Latvia
Expatriate football managers in Moldova
Expatriate football managers in Lithuania
Expatriate football managers in Ukraine
Expatriate football managers in Kazakhstan
Belarusian expatriate sportspeople in Latvia
Belarusian expatriate sportspeople in Moldova
Belarusian expatriate sportspeople in Lithuania
Belarusian expatriate sportspeople in Ukraine
Belarusian expatriate sportspeople in Kazakhstan
FC Molodechno managers
Belarus national football team managers
FK Ventspils managers
FC Sheriff Tiraspol managers
FC Torpedo Minsk managers
FBK Kaunas managers
FC Metalurh Zaporizhzhia managers
FC Belshina Bobruisk managers
FC Vėtra managers
FC Dynamo Brest managers
FC SKVICH Minsk managers
FC Vitebsk managers
Kazakhstan national under-21 football team managers
FC Shakhtyor Soligorsk managers
FC Dinamo Minsk managers
Moldovan Super Liga managers